The Internationales Congress Centrum Berlin (abbreviated ICC Berlin), located in the Westend locality of the Berlin borough of Charlottenburg-Wilmersdorf, is one of the largest conference centres in the world. It is used for conventions, theatrical productions and concerts. In April 2014 it was closed in order to remove asbestos contamination, and remains closed . In October 2021, it was temporarily reopened for the art project The Sun Machine Is Coming Down as part of the Berliner Festspiele.

Overview
ICC Berlin opened in 1979 (three years after the opening of the Palace of the Republic), and its architects were Ursulina Schüler-Witte and Ralf Schüler. It is 320 metres long, 80 metres wide and 40 metres high. It is linked to the neighboring Messe Berlin fairgrounds; often joining in trade shows and exhibitions.

As perhaps Europe's biggest such centre, it was instrumental to Berlin being one of the top congress cities in the world. It is serviced by S-Bahn station Berlin Messe Nord/ICC. By its own reckoning, ICC Berlin is a landmark of post-war German architecture and has served as an inspiration for similar facilities around the globe.

The current ICC is contaminated by asbestos.  Its removal will cost much more than the originally planned 259 million Euro.

In popular culture
The ICC features prominently in the 1980 disco musical The Apple, in which it appears as a futuristic concert venue. Many of the film's exterior and interior scenes were filmed in and around the building.

The 2009 movie The International was partly filmed in the interior of ICC Berlin.

The pedestrian tunnel was used as a set for popular dance track Around the World (La La La La La) by German Eurodance group ATC in 1999.

References

External links

 ICC Berlin descriptions

Convention centres in Germany
Theatres in Berlin
Concert halls in Germany
High-tech architecture
Buildings and structures in Charlottenburg-Wilmersdorf
Buildings and structures completed in 1979
Music in Berlin